Hassam may refer to:

 Childe Hassam (1859–1935), an American impressionist painter
 Hassam Al Doubaykhi, a Saudi prisoner at the United States Guantanamo Bay Naval Base
 Hassam-ud-Din Rashidi, (1911–1982), a Pakistani journalist
 Umm Al Hassam, a neighborhood in Bahrain
 Hassam, Rasulpur, a village in Pakistan
 Hassam v Jacobs, a South African legal precedent